The Tacarcuna bush tanager (Chlorospingus tacarcunae) is a species of bird  traditionally placed in the family Thraupidae, but now viewed closer to Arremonops in the Passerellidae.

It is found in Panama and far northwestern Colombia.
Its natural habitat is subtropical or tropical moist montane forests.

References

Tacarcuna bush tanager
Birds of Panama
Tacarcuna bush tanager
Taxonomy articles created by Polbot